The Rural Municipality of Oakland is a former rural municipality (RM) in the Canadian province of Manitoba. It was originally incorporated as a rural municipality on December 22, 1883. It ceased on January 1, 2015 as a result of its provincially mandated amalgamation with the Village of Wawanesa to form the Municipality of Oakland – Wawanesa.

Communities 
 Bunclody
 Carroll
 Methven
 Nesbitt
 Rounthwaite

Education 
Stratherne School was established in November 1884. It moved in 1890 and, in 1950 it was replaced by a new school. The school was finally closed in 1962. In 1970 a cairn was erected to mark the site.

References

External links 
 
 Map of Oakland R.M. at Statcan

Oakland
Populated places disestablished in 2015
2015 disestablishments in Manitoba